The Philippine School of Business Administration is a college located in Quezon City in Metro Manila, Philippines. The college was established in 1963.

Academic programs

Undergraduate studies 
Bachelor of Science in Accountancy
Bachelor of Science in Business Administration includes: 
Banking and Finance
Financial Management
Human Resource Development Management
Management Information System
Marketing

Graduate studies 
Master in Business Administration
Doctor in Business Administration

Campuses
Its Manila campus is located at 826 R. Papa Street, Sampaloc.
Its Quezon City campus is located at 1029 Aurora Boulevard, Quezon City.

References

External links
Philippine School of Business Administration, Manila Campus

Business schools in the Philippines
Universities and colleges in Manila
Education in Sampaloc, Manila
Universities and colleges in Quezon City